María de Lourdes Rojo e Incháustegui, commonly known as María Rojo (born August 15, 1943 in Mexico City), is a Mexican actress and politician. She was Senator of the Republic in the upper house of Mexican Congress. She debuted during the Golden Age of Mexican cinema.

She has participated in successful Mexican films such as: Rojo amanecer, El callejón de los milagros and El Infierno; and telenovelas such as: Alborada, Mañana es para siempre, Corazón Salvaje, and Hasta el fin del mundo.

Early life and career

María Rojo was born on August 15, 1943 in Mexico City. She began her artistic career at eight years in the program Teatro Fantástico with Enrique Alonso "Cachirulo". After acting in several plays as La Mala Semilla and Examen de Muertos in 1955, she began her film career at age 13 in the film Besos Prohibidos in 1956.

She has an outstanding career as film actress and has also starred in many successful telenovelas and theater productions. Her first starring role was in 1975 with the movie . From there, she has worked in over 70 productions and has become one of the most important actresses of Mexican cinema. Her most recognized performances were in the films Rojo amanecer, Danzón, La tarea, El callejón de los milagros, Salón México, Confidencias, De noche vienes Esmeralda,  and El Infierno.

Political career
Maria Rojo was federal deputy in the LVII Legislature of the Congress of the Union in the lower house 1997–2000.

On October 1, 2000, she began her mandate as Borough Chief of Coyoacán in Mexico City. She left office April 4, 2003, to compete for a position in the Legislative Assembly of the Federal District (legislature in Mexico City).

On September 1, 2006, she took office as Senator of the Republic in the upper house of Mexican Congress for the period 2006–2012. She served as chair of the committee on culture.

References

Specific

General

External links 

 
 Maria Rojo en la página oficial de la Cámara de Senadores (Rojo's Homepage in the Mexican Congress

1943 births
Actresses from Mexico City
Living people
Mexican film actresses
Mexican telenovela actresses
Mexican television actresses
Party of the Democratic Revolution politicians
Members of the Senate of the Republic (Mexico)
Women members of the Senate of the Republic (Mexico)
Mexican actor-politicians
Ariel Award winners
Politicians from Mexico City
21st-century Mexican politicians
21st-century Mexican women politicians